The 2008 IFSC Climbing World Cup was held in 15 locations. Bouldering competitions were held in 7 locations, lead in 6 locations, and speed in 6 locations. The season began on 18 April in Hall, Austria and concluded on 16 November in Kranj, Slovenia.

The top 3 in each competition received medals, and the overall winners were awarded trophies. At the end of the season an overall ranking was determined based upon points, which athletes were awarded for finishing in the top 30 of each individual event.

The winners for bouldering were Kilian Fischhuber and Anna Stöhr, for lead Jorg Verhoeven and Johanna Ernst, for speed Evgenii Vaitsekhovskii and Edyta Ropek, and for combined David Lama and Akiyo Noguchi, men and women respectively.
The National Team for bouldering was Austria, for lead Austria, and for speed Russian Federation.

Highlights of the season 
In bouldering, at the World Cup in Moscow, in the women's final, there were three athletes who flashed all 4 boulders (Katharina Saurwein of Austria, Natalija Gros and Katja Vidmar both of Slovenia), however Katharina Saurwein of Austria was the only one who flashed all boulders in the competition (qualification, semifinal, final) and thus taking the win.
At the end of the season, Austrian athletes, Kilian Fischhuber and Anna Stöhr clinched the overall titles of the season for men and women respectively, making it double bouldering titles for Austria.

In lead climbing, Johanna Ernst of Austria, in her first year of eligibility to compete in the World Cup circuit, made her debut in bouldering in Hall, Austria. Then she competed in lead climbing and won 3 out of 6 Lead World Cups and became the overall women's lead climbing winner of the season.

Overview

References

External links 

IFSC Climbing World Cup
2008 in sport climbing